Nils Vigeland (born 1950 in Buffalo, New York) is an American composer and pianist.

Career
Vigeland made his professional debut as a pianist in 1969 with the Buffalo Philharmonic Orchestra. He later studied composition with Lukas Foss at Harvard College, graduating with a B.A. in 1972. He earned his Ph.D at The University at Buffalo where he studied composition with Morton Feldman and piano with Yvar Mikhashoff. After graduation, Vigeland toured for eight years with percussionist Jan Williams and flautist Eberhard Blum, performing extended length works for flute, percussion and piano that Feldman composed for them.

From 1980 to 1989, Vigeland directed The Bowery Ensemble, which gave an annual series of concerts in Cooper Union, NYC. The ensemble was strongly associated with the music of the New York School and gave the first performance of over thirty works by composers including Pauline Oliveros, Christian Wolff, Leo Smit, Chris Newman and John Thow.

Recordings of Vigeland's music are available from Mode, EMF, Focus, Lovely Music, and Naxos. His choral music is published by Boosey and Hawkes. He taught at Manhattan School of Music for thirty years, retiring as Chair of the Composition Department in 2013.

Notable students
 Christopher Cerrone
 Ted Hearne
 Reiko Fueting
 Scott Wollschleger
 Juan Pablo Contreras

References

External links
 Nils Vigeland's official website at Saint-Petersburg Contemporary Music Center
 Interview with Nils Vigeland reMusik Journal, Saint-Petersburg Contemporary Music Center. Interview: № 4-120205.
Nils Vigeland Home page at Manhattan Music School of Music

1950 births
Living people
American male composers
American male pianists
Education in Manhattan
Harvard College alumni
Manhattan School of Music
University at Buffalo alumni